Marigot is a commune in the Jacmel Arrondissement, in the Sud-Est department of Haiti. It has 50,739 inhabitants.

In early 1793, during the Haitian Revolution, Marigot's black inhabitants rebelled and built a fort in the city. Abbé Aubert, a white priest and leader of the rebellion in the area, also commandeered Marigot's cannons and contributed them to Romaine-la-Prophétesse's slave uprising around and siege of Jacmel.

The Haitian writer  was born in Marigot.

References

Populated places in Sud-Est (department)
Communes of Haiti